Penny Bickle is Senior Lecturer in Archaeology at the University of York and her research focuses on daily routine in the Neolithic period.

Research 
Bickle's research focuses on life in the Neolithic period. She is Principal Investigator for the Counter Culture project, which investigates social diversity in central Europe across one thousand years of the Neolithic period. She is an adviser on Consuming Prehistory project, which examines food consumption at Stonehenge.  She was featured on BBC Radio 3 discussing the importance that finds of pig bones could have for the site. Another area of interest for Bickle is the role that dairy played in prehistoric diet. She collaborated on the NeoMilk Project which examined the role of cattle and dairy products in Neolithic Europe.

The role of gender in prehistoric societies is one that Bickle has explored, examining the differences between male-sexed and female-sexed bodies in Linearbandkeramik (LBK) culture. This research includes examining isotopic, archaeological and osteological data from Moravia and western Slovakia. She has also examined ageing and childhood in the LBK culture and how it intersects with social identity.

Bickle is leading a research project examining the Neolithic at Wildmore Fen, Lincolnshire. She is also interested in different theoretical approaches to archaeology. Bickle wrote the entry for 'Science and Feminism' in the Encyclopaedia of Archaeological Sciences.

Career 
Bickle graduated from the University of Sheffield with a degree in Archaeology in 2002. She worked in commercial archaeology before moving to Cardiff University to study for her MA, graduating in 2004. She then studied for a PhD examining at Neolithic architecture in northern France, which was awarded in 2009. It was entitled: Life and death of the longhouse: Daily life during and after the early Neolithic in the river valleys of the Paris Basin. Post-doctoral, interdisciplinary projects included: part of a team at the Universities of Oxford and Durham, she worked on Linearbandkeramik (LBK) culture in Europe; then at the University of Cardiff on The Times of Their Lives, which used Bayesian statistical analysis to create more precise chronologies for the Neolithic.

Bickle was appointed Lecturer in Archaeology at the University of York in 2014, and was promoted to Senior Lecturer in 2019.

References 

Living people
Year of birth missing (living people)
British archaeologists
British women archaeologists
Bioarchaeologists
Prehistorians
Alumni of Cardiff University
Academics of the University of York